The 1999 TIG Classic singles was the singles event of the twentieth edition of the second tournament in the US Open Series.

Lindsay Davenport was the defending champion, but she was defeated in the semifinals by Venus Williams. Martina Hingis then defeated Williams in the final to claim her second San Diego title.

This tournament is notable for featuring the last match of 22 time grand slam champion Steffi Graf. Graf withdrew from her opening match against Amy Frazier early in the third set. She was struggling with her hamstring and thigh. After years of battling with injury woes, she officially retired from professional tennis soon after.

Seeds

Draw

Finals

Top half

Bottom half

Qualifying

Seeds

Qualifiers

Lucky loser
  Ai Sugiyama

Qualifying draw

First qualifier

Second qualifier

Third qualifier

Fourth qualifier

External links
 ITF singles results page

Singles
TIG Classic - Singles